James Paton (born 24 May 1957 in Newcastle) is a sport shooter from Canada.

He won the gold medal in the fullbore rifle Queen's Prize open individual event and the silver in the fullbore rifle Queen's Prize open pairs event (with Alain Marion) at the 1998 Commonwealth Games in Kuala Lumpur, and silver medals in the Queen's Prize fullbore rifle events (individual, and pairs with Desmond Vamplew) at the 2014 Commonwealth Games in Glasgow.

In 2005, he won the Queen's Prize at the NRA Imperial Meeting at Bisley Camp, setting a record score of 300.40v.

References

1957 births
Living people
Canadian male sport shooters
Shooters at the 1998 Commonwealth Games
Shooters at the 2006 Commonwealth Games
Shooters at the 2014 Commonwealth Games
Commonwealth Games gold medallists for Canada
Commonwealth Games silver medallists for Canada
Commonwealth Games medallists in shooting
Medallists at the 1998 Commonwealth Games
Medallists at the 2014 Commonwealth Games